Michael Gene Mosley (born June 30, 1958 in Hillsboro, Texas) is a former American football wide receiver in the National Football League.

Early years
Mosley starred at Humble High School in Humble, Texas. He played quarterback at Texas A&M where he finished his career 3rd all-time for the Aggies in rushing yards by a quarterback. As a freshman, Mosley replaced an injured David Walker against TCU and led the Aggies to victory in Fort Worth rushing for 96 yards and a touchdown in a 52-23 thrashing of the Horned Frogs. Mosley would not relinquish the job, becoming the Aggies' starting quarterback for the next three seasons.

NFL
He was selected as a receiver by the Buffalo Bills in the third round of the 1981 NFL Draft. During his three NFL seasons, he was a special teams standout as the primary kick and punt returner on the 1982 Bills team. Unfortunately, a series of injuries cut short his promising NFL career and forced Mosley to retire after the 1984 season.

References

External links
NFL.com player page
Stats
Gridiron Greats article

 

1958 births
Living people
People from Hillsboro, Texas
American football wide receivers
Texas A&M Aggies football players
Buffalo Bills players